ISO 8601 has been adopted as BIS IS 7900:2001 (Data elements and interchange formats – Information interchange – Representation of dates and times - first revision).

The BIS (Bureau of Indian Standards) of the Government of India thus officially recommends use of the date format YYYY-MM-DD.

Date
In India, the DD-MM-YY is the predominant short form of the numeric date usage. The hyphen (-) is the SEPARATE symbol. Almost all government documents need to be filled up in the DD-MM-YYYY format. An example of DD-MM-YYYY usage is the passport application form.

But two expanded forms are used in India. The DD MMMM YYYY usage (e.g. 21 October 2022) is more prevalent over the MMMM DD, YYYY (e.g. October 21, 2022) usage except the latter is more used by media publications, such as the print version of the Times of India and The Hindu.
Many government websites, including Prime Minister's official website, retain the historical format used by Britain (MMMM DD, YYYY) during the colonial era until sometime in the 20th century.

  

The month-day-year (12/31/1999) in short format, is never used in India except regionally in Bodo.

Mondays are the start of the week as per ISO 8601. Traditionally, Sunday (Ravivara) is considered as the first day of the week in India and the official calendar reckoned by the Government Of India has Sunday to Saturday as the week. In Indian Railway time tables day 1 is Monday and day 7 is Sunday, e.g. train 12345 runs on days 1, 2, 3, 4, and 5, in other words Monday through Friday.

Time
The 12-hour notation is widely used in daily life, written communication, and is used in spoken language. The 24-hour notation is used in rare situations where there would be widespread ambiguity. Examples include railway timetables, plane departure and landing timings. A colon is used to separate hours, minutes and seconds (for example 10:00:15). However, full stop is almost exclusively used instead of colons in Bengali.

See also 
 Time in India 
 Hindu units of time
 History of measurement systems in India
 Daylight saving time
 Daylight saving time by country

References

Time in India
India